Harztor is a municipality in the district of Nordhausen, in Thuringia, Germany. It was formed on 1 January 2012 by the merger of the former municipalities Ilfeld and Niedersachswerfen. In July 2018 the former municipalities of Harzungen, Herrmannsacker and Neustadt/Harz were merged into Harztor.

References

Nordhausen (district)